Robert Lynn Clotworthy (May 8, 1931 – June 1, 2018) was an American diver. He competed in the 3 m springboard at the 1952 and 1956 Olympics and won a bronze and a gold medal, respectively. He also won two medals at the 1955 Pan American Games. In 1980 he was inducted into the International Swimming Hall of Fame.

Early life
Clotworthy was born in Newark, New Jersey and grew up in nearby Westfield. He began training for his Olympic career in high school, spending hours each day practicing dives and perfecting them. Clotworthy dove for the Westfield High School team, Plainfield Swim Club and Westfield YMCA, where coaches Ed Gillen and Stan Dudeck coached him. When he competed for the Olympics, he participated and dove for the New York Athletic Club. He went on to be coached in Ohio State by Mike Peppe. Others who helped Clotworthy during his career were Hobie Billingsley, Phil Moriarty, Charlie Batterman, Glen and Pat McCormick.  He competed in the 1955 Pan-American Games in Mexico City, where he met Cynthia Gill, a member of the U.S. swimming team. They married the following year. After retiring from competition, Clotworthy coached at Army, Dartmouth, Princeton, Arizona State, Texas, and New Mexico. From 1981 through 1984, he produced six NAIA champions at the University of Wisconsin-Eau Claire. Clotworthy attended Ohio State University where he majored in Physical Education. He graduated in the 1954, then leading him to retire from diving in 1956 and coaching in August 2006.

National titles and accomplishments
 1951 AAU Outdoor Nationals 3 meter champion.
 1953 AAU Indoor Nationals 1 meter champion.
 1953 AAU Outdoor Nationals 3 meter champion.
 1956 AAU Indoor Nationals 1 meter champion.
 1956 AAU Outdoor Nationals 3 meter champion.

Coaching accomplishments
 1955–56 Coached diving at West Point.
 1958 Coached diving at Dartmouth College.
 1958 Coached diving at Dartmouth College.
 1958–70 Coached swimming and diving at Princeton University.
 1970–71 Coached diving at the Arizona State University.
 1972–76 Coached diving at the University of Texas.
 1980–1984 Coached diving at the University of Wisconsin-Eau Claire.
 1984–1996 Coached diving at Albuquerque Academy, New Mexico.
 1997–2006 Coached Age Group Swimming – Taos Swim Club, Taos, New Mexico.

See also
 List of members of the International Swimming Hall of Fame

References

1931 births
2018 deaths
Divers at the 1952 Summer Olympics
Divers at the 1956 Summer Olympics
Olympic gold medalists for the United States in diving
Olympic bronze medalists for the United States in diving
People from Westfield, New Jersey
Sportspeople from Newark, New Jersey
Sportspeople from Union County, New Jersey
Ohio State Buckeyes men's divers
Army Black Knights diving coaches
Dartmouth Big Green diving coaches
Princeton Tigers swimming coaches
Princeton Tigers diving coaches
Arizona State Sun Devils diving coaches
Texas Longhorns diving coaches
American male divers
Medalists at the 1956 Summer Olympics
Medalists at the 1952 Summer Olympics
Pan American Games bronze medalists for the United States
Pan American Games medalists in diving
Divers at the 1955 Pan American Games
Westfield High School (New Jersey) alumni
Medalists at the 1955 Pan American Games